Castelculier  (Languedocien: Castelculhèr) is a commune in the Lot-et-Garonne department in south-western France.

History
The name of the village comes from the medieval fortress known as Chasteau Cullier. This castle was destroyed by the duke of Épernon in 1633 by order of Louis XIII, king of France.

Geography
The Séoune forms most of the commune's south-eastern border.

Administration
List of mayors since 1791 :

The town hall is located in the village of Grandfonds.

Lordship of Castelculier 
List of the lords of Castelculier

Main sights 
 Church of Saint-Amans

Personalities
 Jean Florimond Boudon de Saint-Amans
 Jean-Baptiste Alexandre Damaze de Chaudordy, French diplomat

See also
Communes of the Lot-et-Garonne department

References 

Communes of Lot-et-Garonne